Francis Hubert Palmer MC (6 August 1877 – 7 December 1951) was a rugby union international who represented England in 1905.

Early life
Francis Palmer was born on 6 August 1877 in Hereford, England and educated at Bedford School. He played for England against Wales at Cardiff on 14 January 1905.  He died on 7 December 1951.

References

1877 births
1951 deaths
English rugby union players
England international rugby union players
People educated at Bedford School
Rugby union players from Hereford